A  liquid hydrogen trailer is a trailer designed to carry cryogenic liquid hydrogen (LH2) on roads being pulled by a powered vehicle. The largest such vehicles are similar to railroad tanktainers which are also designed to carry liquefied loads. Liquid hydrogen trailers tend to be large; they are insulated. Some are semi-trailers.

History
The U-1 semi-trailer was a liquid hydrogen trailer designed in the 1950s to carry cryogenic liquid hydrogen (LH2) on roads being pulled by a powered vehicle. The U-1 was a single axle semi-trailer. The specifications for its successor the U-2, a double axle semi-trailer, were issued on 15 March 1957.

Size and volume
Liquid hydrogen trailers are referenced by their size or volume capacity. Liquid hydrogen trailers typically have capacities ranging from  gross volume.

See also

 Compressed hydrogen tube trailer
Hydrogen economy
Hydrogen infrastructure
 Liquid hydrogen tank car
 Liquid hydrogen tanktainer
 Trailer (vehicle)

References

External links
Liquid Hydrogen Transport by Truck

Trailers
Hydrogen infrastructure
Industrial gases
Cryogenics